North Road may refer to:

North Road (Glossop), a cricket and former football ground in Glossop, England
North Road (Manchester), a former football ground in Manchester, England
North Road railway station, a railway station in Darlington, England
North Road railway station, the original name of Ormond railway station in Melbourne, Australia
Route du Nord, a road in Canada
Bicycle handlebar#Upright or North Road
A nickname for the northern portion of the Kenai Spur Highway between Kenai and Nikiski, Alaska

See also
Great North Road (disambiguation)
Old North Road, another name for Ermine Street, a major Roman Road in the United Kingdom
Old North Road railway station, a former station in Cambridgeshire, United Kingdom
Plymouth North Road railway station, the original name of the present Plymouth railway station in Plymouth, United Kingdom